Developmentally-regulated GTP-binding protein 2 is a protein that in humans is encoded by the DRG2 gene.

The DRG2 gene encodes the developmentally regulated GTP-binding protein 2, a name derived from the fact that it shares significant similarity to known GTP-binding proteins. DRG2 was identified because it is expressed in normal fibroblasts but not in SV40-transformed fibroblasts. Read-through transcripts containing this gene and a downstream gene have been identified, but they are not thought to encode a fusion protein. This gene is located within the Smith-Magenis syndrome region on chromosome 17.

References

Further reading